The Commissar Order was an order issued by the German High Command (OKW) on 6 June 1941 before Operation Barbarossa. Its official name was Guidelines for the Treatment of Political Commissars (Richtlinien für die Behandlung politischer Kommissare). It instructed the Wehrmacht that any Soviet political commissar identified among captured troops be summarily executed as a purported enforcer of the so-called Judeo-Bolshevism ideology in military forces. It is one of a series of criminal orders issued by the leadership.

According to the order, all those prisoners who could be identified as "thoroughly bolshevized or as active representatives of the Bolshevist ideology" should also be killed.

History 

Planning for Operation Barbarossa began in June 1940. In December 1940, Hitler began vague allusions to the operation to senior generals on how the war was to be conducted, giving him the opportunity to gauge their reaction to such matters as collaboration with the SS in the "rendering harmless" of Bolsheviks, which eventually culminated in Führer Directive 21 on 18 December 1940. The Wehrmacht was already politicised to some extent, having participated in the extra-legal killings of Ernst Röhm and his associates in 1934, communists in the Sudetenland in 1938, and Czech and German political exiles in France in 1940. On March 3 1941, Hitler explained to his closest military advisers how the war of annihilation was to be waged. On that same day, instructions incorporating Hitler's demands went to Section L of the Oberkommando der Wehrmacht (OKW) (under Deputy Chief Walter Warlimont); these provided the basis for the "Guidelines in Special Areas to Instructions No. 21 (Case Barbarossa)" discussing, among other matters, the interaction of the army and SS in the theatre of operations, deriving from the "need to neutralise at once leading bolsheviks and commissars."

Discussions proceeded on March 17 during a situation conference, where Chief of the OKH General Staff Franz Halder, Quartermaster-General Eduard Wagner and Chief of Operational Department of the OKH Adolf Heusinger were present. Hitler declared: "The intelligentsia established by Stalin must be exterminated. The most brutal violence is to be used in the Great Russian Empire" (quoted from Halder's War Diary entry of March 17).

On March 30, Hitler addressed over 200 senior officers in the Reich Chancellery. Among those present was Halder, who recorded the key points of the speech. He argued that the war against the Soviet Union "cannot be conducted in a knightly fashion" because it was a war of "ideologies and racial differences."  He further declared that the Commissars had to be "liquidated" without mercy because they were the "bearers of ideologies directly opposed to National Socialism." Hitler stipulated the "annihilation of the Bolshevik commissars and the Communist intelligentsia" (thus laying the foundation for the Commissar Order), dismissed the idea of court martials for felonies committed by the German troops, and emphasised the different nature of the war in the East from the war in the West.

Hitler was well aware that this order was illegal, but personally absolved in advance any soldiers who violated international law in enforcing this order. He said that the Hague Conventions of 1899 and 1907 did not apply since the Soviets had not signed them. The Soviet Union, as a distinct entity from the Russian Empire, did not, in fact, sign the Geneva Convention of 1929. However, Germany did, and was bound by article 82, stating "In case, in time of war, one of the belligerents is not a party to the Convention, its provisions shall nevertheless remain in force as between the belligerents who are parties thereto."

The Commissar Order read as follows:

Response 

The first draft of the Commissar Order was issued by General Eugen Müller on 6 May 1941 and called for the shooting of all commissars in order to avoid letting any captured commissar reach a POW camp in Germany. The German historian Hans-Adolf Jacobsen wrote:

There was never any doubt in the minds of German Army commanders that the order deliberately flouted international law; that is borne out by the unusually small number of written copies of the Kommissarbefehl which were distributed.

The paragraph in which General Müller called for army commanders to prevent "excesses" was removed on the request of the OKW. Brauchitsch amended the order on 24 May 1941 by attaching Müller's paragraph and calling on the army to maintain discipline in the enforcement of the order. The final draft of the order was issued by OKW on 6 June 1941 and was restricted only to the most senior commanders, who were instructed to inform their subordinates verbally.

Nazi propaganda presented Barbarossa as an ideological-racial war between German National Socialism and "Judeo-Bolshevism," dehumanising the Soviet enemy as a force of Slavic Untermensch (sub-humans) and "Asiatic" savages engaging in "barbaric Asiatic fighting methods" commanded by evil Jewish commissars to whom German troops were to grant no mercy. The vast majority of the Wehrmacht officers and soldiers tended to regard the war in Nazi terms, seeing their Soviet opponents as sub-human.

The enforcement of the Commissar Order led to thousands of executions. The German historian Jürgen Förster wrote in 1989 that it was simply not true that the Commissar Order was not enforced, as most German Army commanders claimed in their memoirs and some German historians like Ernst Nolte were still claiming. The majority of German units carried out the Commissar Order. Erich von Manstein passed on the Commissar Order to his subordinates, who executed all the captured commissars, something that he was convicted of by a British court in 1949. After the war, Manstein lied about disobeying the Commissar Order, saying he had been opposed to the order, and never enforced it. On 23 September 1941, after several Wehrmacht commanders had asked for the order to be softened as a way of encouraging the Red Army to surrender, Hitler declined "any modification of the existing orders regarding the treatment of political commissars."

When the Commissar Order became known among the Red Army it provoked stronger resistance to German forces. This unwanted effect was cited in German appeals to Hitler (e.g. by Claus von Stauffenberg), who finally cancelled the Commissar Order after one year, on 6 May 1942. The order was used as evidence at the Nuremberg Trials and as part of the broader issue of whether the German generals were obligated to follow orders from Hitler even when they knew those orders were illegal.

See also 
 Political Directorate of the Soviet Army and Soviet Navy
 Commando Order
 Severity Order
 German mistreatment of Soviet prisoners of war
 German High Command orders for Treatment of Soviet Prisoners of War

References

Citations

Sources 

 Burleigh, Michael. Ethics and Extermination. 1st ed. Cambridge: Cambridge University Press, 1997. Cambridge Books Online. Web. 5 May 2016. 
 Jürgen Förster: "The Wehrmacht and the War of Extermination Against the Soviet Union" pages 494-520 from The Nazi Holocaust Part 3 The "Final Solution": The Implementation of Mass Murder Volume 2 edited by Michael Marrus, Westpoint: Meckler Press, 1989 .
 Jürgen Förster: "Das Unternehmen 'Barbarossa' als Eroberungs- und Vernichtungskrieg." In: 
 
 
 
 
 Helmut Krausnick: "Kommissarbefehl und 'Gerichtsbarkeitserlass Barbarossa' in neuer Sicht," In: Vierteljahrshefte für Zeitgeschichte. 25, 1977, pp. 682–738.
 Reinhard Otto: "Wehrmacht, Gestapo und sowjetische Kriegsgefangene im deutschen Reichsgebiet 1941/42." Munich 1998, .
 Felix Römer: "Der Kommissarbefehl. Wehrmacht und NS-Verbrechen an der Ostfront 1941/42." Schöningh, Paderborn 2008, .
 
 Christian Streit: "Keine Kameraden. Die Wehrmacht und die sowjetischen Kriegsgefangenen 1941–1945." Dietz, Bonn 1991 [1979], .

External links 
  Der Kommissarbefehl 6 June 1941 Hitler
 Commissar order: English translation
  "Fuhrer-Erlasse" 1939–1945 (über die Ausübung der Kriegsgerichtsbarkeit im Gebiet "Barbarossa") 13 May 1941 Keitel

Military history of Germany during World War II
Military history of the Soviet Union during World War II
Eastern Front (World War II)
Orders by Adolf Hitler
Nazi war crimes
War crimes of the Wehrmacht
Anti-communism in Germany
1941 documents
Nazi war crimes in Russia